The Roman Catholic Diocese of Musoma is a diocese located in Musoma in the Ecclesiastical province of Mwanza in Tanzania.

History
 November 4, 1946: Established as Apostolic Vicariate of Musoma-Maswa from the Apostolic Vicariate of Mwanza
 June 24, 1950: Demoted as Apostolic Prefecture of Musoma
 July 5, 1957: Promoted as Diocese of Musoma
 November 27, 2010: Territory lost to Roman Catholic Diocese of Bunda

Leadership
 Vicar Apostolic of Musoma-Maswa (Roman rite)
 Bishop Joseph Blomjous, M. Afr. (1946.04.11 – 1950.06.25), appointed Vicar Apostolic of Mwanza
 Prefect Apostolic of Musoma (Roman rite)
 Fr. Giuseppe Gerardo Grondin, M.M. (1950 – 1957)
 Bishops of Musoma (Roman rite)
 Bishop John James Rudin, M.M. (1957.07.05 – 1979.01.12)
 Bishop Anthony Petro Mayalla (1979.01.12 – 1987.11.18), appointed Archbishop of Mwanza
 Bishop Justin Tetmu Samba (1988.10.25 – 2006.08.23)
 Bishop Michael George Mabuga Msonganzila (since 2007.11.10)

See also
Roman Catholicism in Tanzania

Sources
 GCatholic.org
 Catholic Hierarchy

Musoma
Roman Catholic dioceses in Tanzania
Christian organizations established in 1946
Roman Catholic dioceses and prelatures established in the 20th century
Musoma, Roman Catholic Diocese of